South Carolina Highway 410 (SC 410) is a  state highway in Horry County, in the northeastern part of the U.S. state of South Carolina. It travels from U.S. Route 701 (US 701) in the community of Baxter Forks north of SC 22 to the North Carolina state line.

Route description

SC 410 starts at U.S. Route 701 at Baxter Forks and ends at the North Carolina state line, where the road continues as NC 410 into Tabor City.

Major intersections

See also

References

External links

SC 410 at Virginia Highways' South Carolina Highways Annex

410
Transportation in Horry County, South Carolina